Lightsville is an unincorporated community in Darke County, in the U.S. state of Ohio.

History
Lightsville was platted in 1874 by William B. Light, and named for him. A post office called Lightsville was established in 1886, and remained in operation until 1907.

References

Unincorporated communities in Darke County, Ohio
Unincorporated communities in Ohio